Kerk Chee Yee is a Malaysian politician who has served as Member of the Melaka State Legislative Assembly (MLA) for Ayer Keroh since May 2018. He served as Member of the Melaka State Executive Council (EXCO) in the Pakatan Harapan (PH) state administration under former Chief Minister Adly Zahari from May 2018 to the collapse of the PH state administration in March 2020. He is a member from Democratic Action Party (DAP), a component party of the PH coalition and son of former Secretary-General of DAP Kerk Kim Hock.

Election results

References

External links
 

1992 births
Living people
People from Malacca
Malaysian people of Chinese descent
Democratic Action Party (Malaysia) politicians
Members of the Malacca State Legislative Assembly
Malacca state executive councillors
21st-century Malaysian politicians